Liuzao may refer to the following locations in China:

Liuzao, Hebei (留早镇), town in Dingzhou
Liuzao, Shanghai (六灶镇), town in Pudong